Iryna Sotska (born 4 September 1979) is a Paralympic swimmer from Ukraine competing mainly in category S2 events.

Iryna competed as part of the Ukrainian team in the 2008 Summer Paralympics. She competed in the only event for her disability classification the  backstroke winning the silver medal under the old world record but behind team mate Ganna Ielisavetska and ahead of S1 class world record breaker Sara Carracelas García of Spain.

References

External links
 

1979 births
Living people
Ukrainian female backstroke swimmers
Paralympic swimmers of Ukraine
Paralympic bronze medalists for Ukraine
Paralympic silver medalists for Ukraine
Paralympic medalists in swimming
Swimmers at the 2008 Summer Paralympics
Swimmers at the 2012 Summer Paralympics
Medalists at the 2008 Summer Paralympics
Medalists at the 2012 Summer Paralympics
Medalists at the World Para Swimming Championships
Medalists at the World Para Swimming European Championships
People from Sloviansk
Ukrainian female freestyle swimmers
S2-classified Paralympic swimmers
Sportspeople from Donetsk Oblast
21st-century Ukrainian women